Colten Bradley Brewer (born October 29, 1992) is an American professional baseball pitcher in the Tampa Bay Rays organization. He has played in Major League Baseball (MLB) for the Boston Red Sox and the San Diego Padres.

Career

Pittsburgh Pirates
Brewer attended Canton High School in Canton, Texas. The Pittsburgh Pirates selected Brewer in the fourth round of the 2011 MLB draft, and he signed. Brewer made his professional debut in 2012 with the Gulf Coast League Pirates, where he was 1–3 with a 3.24 ERA in eight games (six starts). He began 2013 with the Jamestown Jammers, but played in only three games due to injury, and subsequently missed all of the 2014 season. In 2015, Brewer pitched for the West Virginia Power where he was 5–9 with a 4.90 ERA in 22 starts. In 2016, he played with the Bradenton Marauders where he pitched to a 3–7 record with a 4.09 ERA in 18 games (13 starts).

New York Yankees
The New York Yankees selected Brewer from the Pirates in the minor league phase of the Rule 5 draft after the 2016 season, and he played within the Yankees farm system in 2017. In 41 relief appearances between three minor league teams, Brewer was 3–1 with a 2.82 ERA.

San Diego Padres
On November 22, 2017, Brewer signed a major league contract with the San Diego Padres. He began 2018 with the Triple-A El Paso Chihuahuas. San Diego called up Brewer to the major leagues on April 12, 2018, and he made his debut that same night at AT&T Park against the San Francisco Giants. He was optioned back to El Paso the next day, and made additional appearances with the Padres during the latter half of the season. Overall, Brewer made 11 relief appearances for San Diego, recording a 1–0 record with 5.59 ERA and 10 strikeouts in  innings.

Boston Red Sox
On November 20, 2018, the Padres traded Brewer to the Boston Red Sox for Esteban Quiroz. Brewer was included on Boston's Opening Day roster to start the 2019 season. On May 26, Brewer was optioned to the Triple-A Pawtucket Red Sox; to that point in the season, he had made 20 relief appearances, recording a 5.32 ERA and 0–2 record with 21 strikeouts in 22 innings. He was recalled to Boston on May 29, spending all of June and July with the Red Sox, until being optioned back to Pawtucket on August 4. Brewer was recalled to Boston on September 4, following the end of the Triple-A season. Overall with the 2019 Red Sox, Brewer appeared in 58 games, compiling a 1–2 record with 4.12 ERA and 52 strikeouts in  innings.

On March 26, 2020, the team optioned Brewer to the Double-A Portland Sea Dogs. He was recalled to Boston on July 23, in advance of the delayed start of the  season. Brewer was placed on the 10-day injured list on September 3; he was transferred to the 45-day injured list on September 11. With the 2020 Red Sox, Brewer appeared in 11 games (four starts), compiling an 0–3 record with 5.61 ERA while striking out 25 batters in  innings.

In March 2021, Brewer was optioned to Boston's alternate training site near the end of spring training. After opening the season in Triple-A with the Worcester Red Sox, he was added to Boston's active roster on May 28. In one appearance with Boston, Brewer allowed four runs in one inning pitched. On June 3, he was designated for assignment to make room on the active roster for Brandon Workman. Brewer was outrighted to Triple-A Worcester on June 7. In 11 relief appearances with Worcester, he had a 4.00 ERA while striking out 18 batters in 18 innings.
Brewer became a free agent following the season.

Kansas City Royals
On January 24, 2022, Brewer signed a minor league contract with the Kansas City Royals. He was released on August 3, 2022.

Tampa Bay Rays
On December 15, 2022, Brewer signed a minor league contract with the Tampa Bay Rays.

References

External links

1992 births
Living people
Baseball players from Dallas
Major League Baseball pitchers
San Diego Padres players
Boston Red Sox players
Florida Complex League Red Sox players
Gulf Coast Pirates players
Jamestown Jammers players
West Virginia Power players
Bradenton Marauders players
Tampa Yankees players
Trenton Thunder players
Scranton/Wilkes-Barre RailRiders players
Worcester Red Sox players
El Paso Chihuahuas players